Faj may refer to:

 Fáj, a village in Hungary
 Faj, Iran, a village in Chaharmahal Province, Iran
 Air Fiji, a defunct Fijian airline
 Diego Jiménez Torres Airport, in Puerto Rico, United States
 Faita language, spoken in Papua New Guinea